Akobo Airport is an airport serving the town of Akobo, in South Sudan.

Location
Akobo Airport  is located in Akobo County in Eastern Bieh, in the town of Akobo, near the International border with Ethiopia.

The geographic coordinates of this airport are: 7° 47' 3.12"N, 33° 0' 0.00"E (Latitude: 7.7842; Longitude: 33.0000). The airport has a single 1097-meter long unpaved runway.

Overview
Akobo Airport is a small civilian airport that serves the town of Akobo and surrounding communities. There are no known scheduled airlines serving Akobo Airport at this time.

See also
 Akobo
 Jonglei
 List of airports in South Sudan

References

External links
Location of Akobo Airport At Google Maps

Airports in South Sudan
Jonglei State
Greater Upper Nile